Dobrica is a village in Serbia. It is situated in the Alibunar municipality, in the South Banat District, Vojvodina province. The village has a Serb ethnic majority and a population of 1,344 people according to the 2002 census.

Name

In Serbian, the village is known as Dobrica (Добрица), in German as Dobritza, and in Hungarian as Kevedobra. Name of the village is of Serbian origin and it derived from Serbian word "dobro" ("good" in English).

Historical population

See also
List of places in Serbia
List of cities, towns and villages in Vojvodina

References
Slobodan Ćurčić, Broj stanovnika Vojvodine, Novi Sad, 1996.

External links

Populated places in South Banat District
Populated places in Serbian Banat
Alibunar